The Pomona College Organic Farm is an organic farm on  of the southeast corner of Pomona College's campus in Claremont, California. It is within Blanchard Park (more commonly known as "the Wash"). It was begun as an experimental permaculture project by a group of three friends in 1998, and was institutionalized in 2006.

History
The farm was begun in 1998, when students began composting dining hall waste and planting crops in an unused portion of campus. Masanobu Fukuoka's book The One Straw Revolution provided the initial inspiration. One student remained on campus to tend to the farm over the summer, but, according to the farm's website, only a single tomato grew. Over the next few years, students from the "Gorilla Farming Club" worked to improve the nitrogen content of the soil and remove rocks.

During this time, the farm developed a reputation as an activist space, with extensive marijuana smoking, squatting, and other exploits. This, combined with the farm's unofficial status, led to strained relations with the college's administration. In 2002, students constructed an earth dome using Nader Khalili's superadobe designs, but the college demolished it at the start of the fall 2002 semester because of safety and permitting concerns. In April 2003, plans began for a new, institutionally-approved Earth Dome, which was completed in 2005. In May 2006, the farm and the college reached an agreement on rules for the farm, and it has since become institutionalized and expanded to include the East Farm.

Layout

The farm occupies  of the far southeastern corner of Pomona College's campus, within the naturalistic portion of the campus known as "the Wash" (formally Blanchard Park). It is split into two halves, separated by the college's hammer throw field. The West Farm includes the superadobe Earth Dome, as well as a number of fruit trees, rock-lined student plots, an outdoor classroom, and a chicken coop. The East Farm has a 162-square-foot greenhouse and is used to grow crops and compost waste. A number of coast live oak trees dot the area.

Operations
The farm grows some of the food used in Pomona's dining halls, composts dining hall waste, operates a food stand, and facilitates a course on agriculture in the college's environmental analysis program.

It also hosts a number of events, including an annual "FarmFest", and provides a space for quiet retreat.

It is funded by proceeds from produce sales, the Associated Students of Pomona College, and the Environmental Analysis Department. Pomona alumnus Ronald Lee Fleming has also donated to the farm, funding a statue.

Further reading

References

External links

Archive at the Claremont Colleges Digital Library

Pomona College
Adobe buildings and structures in California
Organic farming in the United States
Farms in California
1998 establishments in California
Guerrilla gardening